Pirrone is a surname. Notable people with the surname include:

 Pirrone (philosopher), a Greek philosopher of Classical antiquity 
 Elena Pirrone (born 1999), Italian racing cyclist
 Giuseppe Pirrone (born 1986), Italian professional footballer
  (1898–1978), Italian sculptor

See also
 Perrone